Alexander Dale Oen (21 May 198530 April 2012) was a Norwegian swimmer. He represented the clubs Vestkantsvømmerne (1995–2010) and Bærumsvømmerne (2011–2012). Dale Oen's gold at the 2008 European Championships made him the first Norwegian male to win a medal at a major international long course championship.

Dale Oen got his international breakthrough in 2005, placing seventh in the 100-metre breaststroke during the 2005 World Aquatics Championships. During the European short-course Championships in December the same year, he swam the 100 m breaststroke in 59.05 seconds, placing fourth and setting a new Nordic Record. He became the first Norwegian to swim this distance in less than 1 minute. At the Norwegian Short Course Championships two months later, he bettered that time to 58.81, a world best mark for the year.

On 30 April 2012, at around 19:50 MST Dale Oen was found unconscious in his hotel bathroom after having suffered a heart attack, caused by chronic, undetected coronary heart disease, a rare disease for a person of his age and fitness. He was found in his bathroom by one of his teammates, and CPR was performed before Dale Oen was brought to Flagstaff Medical Center. He was pronounced dead at 21:00 MST. Dale Oen was attending a training camp with the Norwegian swimming team in Flagstaff, Arizona at the time of his death.

Competitions

At the 2006 FINA Short Course World Championships in Shanghai, Dale Oen won a bronze medal in the 100 m breaststroke, behind Oleg Lisogor and Brenton Rickard, and thus became the first Norwegian male to win a World Championships medal in swimming. Four months later, he followed that up with success at the 2006 European Swimming Championships, winning the silver medal in the 100 m breaststroke and setting a new Nordic record (long course), with 1:00.63.

Dale Oen won his first short-course medal at the 2006 Short Course European Championships in Helsinki, taking bronze behind two Ukrainians in the 100 m breaststroke in a new personal best of 58.70. In the 2007 World Championships, Dale Oen was second fastest in the heats (setting another Nordic record, 1:00.34) and third fastest in the semifinal, but failed in the final, clocking well above 1:01.

Dale Oen repeated the feat of doing better in the semifinal than the final at the 2007 European Short Course Championships. After 58.60, a new personal best and the second-fastest time, in the semifinals, Dale Oen finished in fifth place with a time of 58.81, 0.24 seconds behind the gold medal. However, Dale Oen dominated the 2008 European Championships, setting a record time of 1:00.11 in the heats, and being fastest in both the heats and the semifinal, Dale Oen swam the final in a European record time of 59.76, and won the gold by 0.02 seconds ahead of Hugues Duboscq.

At the 2008 Summer Olympics, Dale Oen earned Norway's first ever Olympic medal in swimming, placing second in the 100 m breaststroke final.

During the 2011 World Championships in Shanghai, Dale Oen won the gold medal in the 100 m breaststroke with the time 58.71, 0.71 seconds ahead of Fabio Scozzoli. This was Norway's first gold medal at a World Championship in swimming. Dale Oen's win was highly publicized because of his emotional response at the award ceremony because of the Oslo attacks a few days earlier.

Personal bests

Long course (50 m)

Short course (25 m)

Death
On 30 April 2012, Dale Oen collapsed in the shower at his training camp in Flagstaff, Arizona. When his teammates thought he was spending a long time showering, they knocked on the door and flicked the light on and off, to which there was no response. They then broke in the door and began administering CPR until the ambulance arrived. Dale Oen was transferred to hospital, but was pronounced dead on arrival, aged 26. An initial autopsy was inconclusive, but a second revealed that Dale Oen suffered from severe atherosclerotic coronary artery disease, with the three main coronary arteries feeding his myocardium up to 90 percent occluded by atherosclerotic plaque, as well as an enlarged heart, and that he died of a myocardial infarction. The autopsy also revealed that he had suffered a series of small heart attacks in the months prior to his death, which apparently went unrecognised. He had experienced pain that radiated down his arm, and into his shoulder, face and chest, but this was attributed to a shoulder injury and a pinched nerve. The only conventional risk factors Dale Oen had for heart disease were a "slightly elevated cholesterol level" and the fact that his grandfather died suddenly at 42, of an unknown cause. His death reminded many of the death of fellow athlete Sergei Grinkov, who also died of coronary artery disease seventeen years earlier at age 28. His funeral was held on 11 May 2012, in Øygarden, Norway.

Tribute
On 2 August 2012, Hungarian swimmer Dániel Gyurta, who won the men's 200 m breaststroke at the 2012 Summer Olympics in London, offered a copy of his gold medal to Dale Oen's family in order to honor their friendship.
Cameron van der Burgh of South Africa, who won the men's 100 m breaststroke and broke the World Record dedicated the swim to Dale Oen because Dale Oen was one of his close friends and greatest rival. The new public swimming pool in Bergen is named Alexander Dale Oen Arena (ADO Arena) in his honour. Among others, the Norwegian prime minister Erna Solberg held a speech at the opening of ADO Arena in 2014, naming Dale Oen as perhaps the greatest athlete of the country.

References

1985 births
2012 deaths
Olympic silver medalists for Norway
Norwegian male breaststroke swimmers
Swimmers at the 2004 Summer Olympics
Swimmers at the 2008 Summer Olympics
Olympic swimmers of Norway
World Aquatics Championships medalists in swimming
People from Øygarden
Sportspeople from Bergen
Medalists at the FINA World Swimming Championships (25 m)
European Aquatics Championships medalists in swimming
Medalists at the 2008 Summer Olympics
Olympic silver medalists in swimming
20th-century Norwegian people
21st-century Norwegian people